Harley-Davidson pinball may refer to:

Harley-Davidson (Bally pinball), a pinball machine made by Midway under the Bally brand
Harley-Davidson (Sega/Stern pinball), a pinball machine made by Sega Pinball and continued by Stern Pinball